Rhopalocarpus lucidus is a tree in the family Sphaerosepalaceae. It is endemic to Madagascar.

Distribution and habitat
Rhopalocarpus lucidus is a widespread species in Madagascar. Its habitat is forests and thickets from sea-level to  altitude. Some populations are within protected areas.

Threats
Because Rhopalocarpus lucidus is used as firewood and for making tools and rope, subsistence harvesting is a threat.

References

lucidus
Endemic flora of Madagascar
Trees of Madagascar
Plants described in 1846
Taxa named by Wenceslas Bojer